The Men's 20 km Walk at the 2001 World Championships in Edmonton, Alberta, Canada was held on Saturday August 4, 2001, with the start at 15:50h.

Medalists

Abbreviations
All times shown are in hours:minutes:seconds

Records

Startlist

Intermediates

Final ranking

See also
2001 Race Walking Year Ranking

References
 IAAF
 Die Leichtathletik-Statistik-Seite

W
Racewalking at the World Athletics Championships